Georg Maria Stenz (22 November 1869 – 23 April 1928) was a Catholic missionary of the Society of the Divine Word in Shandong during the period from 1893 to 1927. He was involved in two major incidents where force was used against Catholic missionaries in Shandong, the Juye incident and the Jietou incident. The Juye incident (1897) was an attack on Stenz's mission station in Zhang Jia Village in which two German missionaries were killed. Stenz, who was the likely target of the attack, managed to hide and escaped unharmed. The incident was used by the German Empire to justify the occupation of Qingdao. In the Jietou incident, Stenz and a group of Chinese Christians were mistreated and held prisoner in the village of Jietou (Rizhao) for three days (8–11 November 1898) resulting in German military intervention and compensation claims.

Early life
Born  in Horhausen, Westerwald, Georg Stenz was the son of the elementary school teacher Jacob Stenz and his wife Maria (née Dasbach). He was the oldest of 7 children (2 boys and 5 girls) of which only he and his sister Maria (born 1878) lived to adulthood. He attended the elementary school in Horhausen, where his father was a teacher from 1875 to 1880. From 1880 to the autumn of 1881, he was given private lessons by a chaplain in Horhausen, possibly for health reasons. In the autumn of 1881, he entered the second year (quinta) of a secondary school (gymnasium) in Montabaur where he lived in a residence (konvikt) of the Diocese of Limburg.  In February 1887, he requested admission to the mission Divine Word Missionaries in Style, where he continued his education from 25 April 1887, onwards in the missionaries' secondary school ("Styler Lyzeum").  He graduated from the Styler Lyzeum (matura) after two years.  Since the degree from the Styler Lyzeum was not recognized by the German state, he also gained a high-school diploma from the Montabaur secondary school in 1889 as an external student.  He became a novice and studied theology at the St. Gabriel mission house of the Divine Word Missionaries in Maria Enzersdorf to the southwest of Vienna.  He made his temporary vows at St. Gabriel on 21 November 1891, and was ordained as a priest in the same place on 25 June 1893.  He was sent on  mission to China on 17 September 1893, together with Joseph Hesser (1867-1920) and Josef Schneider (1867-1896) who had been ordained as priests with him.  The three traveled to Genoa via Cologne, Basel, Luzern, and Milan.  On 25 September 1893, the three missionaries boarded the steamship Bayern of the shipping company Norddeutscher Lloyd in Genoa.  After a voyage via Naples, Port Said, Suez, Aden, and Colombo, they arrived in Hong Kong on 25 October.  After a few days stay in Hong Kong, Stenz traveled on the Bayern to Shanghai, where he arrived on 29 October 1893.

Activities as a missionary
After his arrival in Shandong, Georg Stenz stayed in the headquarters of the Society of the Divine Word in Shandong to learn Chinese. At the time, the headquarters was located in the town of Puoli (郭里镇), about 30 km southeast of the city of Jining. He stayed there until early 1895, when he was sent to work as an assistant to Franz-Xavier Nies in the mission station at Jiaxiang (嘉祥镇), a town about 25 km to the west of Jining. In the autumn of 1896, Stenz was promoted to rector and took up his residence in the Zhang Jia Village (张家庄). His direct superior (dean) was Richard Henle. About one year after the arrival of Stenz in Zhang Jia Village, on 1 November 1897, he became the target of an attack, the Juye Incident, that killed Nies and Henle who were visiting Stenz in Zhang Jia Village at the time. In the autumn of 1898, Stenz was relocated and given responsibility for the mission in the areas of Rizhao and Zhucheng. Stenz travelled from Qingdao to Rizhao by sea on November 1, 1898, and embarked on a tour of the area. Seven days later, on November 8, he arrived in Jiechuang near the village of Jietou, about 35 km northwest of Rizhao. There he was held captive and mistreated in the Jietou Incident until the magistrate of Rhizhao intervened and had him freed around noon on 11 November. After the incident, Stenz was treated in a hospital in Qingdao. In the spring of 1899, Stenz participated in a German punitive expedition that was dispatched from Qingdao to Rizhao to avenge an attack on three Germans (a lieutenant, a mining engineer, and an interpreter). On 16 June 1899, a German newspaper (Kölnische Volkszeitung) ran a story that depicted life in the German colony of Qingdao in a negative light and blamed, e.g., German soldiers for lack of discipline, drunkenness, sexuell harassment of Chinese girls, and violent abuse of the local Chinese population. Although the article was published anonymously, Stenz was suspected to be the author and as a consequence was moved from Qingdao to Jining in early 1900 and was forbidden to write by the Vicar Apostolic of Southern Shandong, Johann Baptist von Anzer. On 25 April 1900, Stenz left Jining to travel to Europe for medical treatment and recuperation. However, he may have been sent away because he was putting a strain on the relationship between the mission and the German authorities in Qingdao. While in Europe, Stenz participated in a push to remove Bishop Anzer from office. Anzer came to Rome to defend himself, but died on 24 November 1903, before his case could be resolved. Stenz returned to Shandong on 20 May 1904. After his return, he continued to participate in several missionary education activities for more than 20 years.

Death

Stenz suffered from a stroke on 17 March 1927, that deprived him of the ability to speak. On 3 May of the same year, he traveled to the USA via Shanghai for recuperation. In Techny, Illinois, he suffered from a second stroke on 21 April 1928, that left him unconscious. He died without having regained his consciousness on April 23. Georg Maria Stenz is buried on the cemetery of the compound of the Society of the Divine Word in Techny.

Attitude towards the Chinese
In his writings, Stenz refers to the Chinese as "yellow queue men" ("gelber Zopfmann") and claims that "the Chinese in general" ("der Chinese im allgemeinen") show what he considers "very disagreeable character traits to Europeans" ("dem Europäer gegenüber sehr unsympathische Charaktereigenschaften"). In particular, he describes them as cunning ("verschmitzt") and with few exceptions incapable of true friendships ("gediegene Freundschaften"), as well as irascible ("Zorn"), cruel ("Grausamkeit"), cowardly ("Feigheit"), arrogant ("Stolz"), thankless ("Undankbarkeit"), and superstitious ("abergläubisch"). He also describes the Chinese as filthy ("Schmutzigkeit"), but excuses this as a consequence of poverty.

Opinions about Georg M. Stenz
Joseph Esherick has characterised Stenz as a "particularly obnoxious missionary" with "a strikingly unattractive character" who "thoroughly typified the militancy of the S.V.D. mission".

Works by Georg M. Stenz
In der Heimat des Konfuzius: Skizzen, Bilder und Erlebnisse aus Schantung, Druck und Verlag der Missionsdruckerei, 1902
Aus weiter Ferne: In Deutsch-China und Süd-Schantung. Kleine Erzählungen aus dem Leben der Missionare und Christen, Ensslin & Laiblin, 1903
In Korea, dem Lande der "Morgenstille", Ensslin & Laiblin, 1904
Ins Reich des Drachen: unter dem Banner des Kreuzes, Friedrich Alber, Ravensburg, 1906
Beiträge zur Volkskunde Süd-Schantungs, R. Voigtländer, 1907
Deutsch-chinesisches Wörterbuch, St. Franz Haver Kolleg, 1920
P. Richard Henle, Missionar in China, Druck und Verlag der Missionsdruckerei, Steyl, 1925
Chinesisch-deutsches Wörterbuch, Druck und Verlag der Katholischen Mission Yenchowfu, 1928

References

External links 

1869 births
1928 deaths
Divine Word Missionaries Order
German Roman Catholic missionaries
Roman Catholic missionaries in China
German expatriates in China